Demene Parish is an administrative unit of Augšdaugava Municipality in the Selonia region of Latvia.

Towns, villages and settlements of Demene Parish 
Demene

Parishes of Latvia
Augšdaugava Municipality
Selonia